Suar may refer to:

People
 Adrián Suar, Argentinian actor and producer

Places
 Suar, Volga Bulgaria
 Suar, Uttar Pradesh
 Suar (Assembly constituency)
 Suar Principality
 Suar River, India

Other
 Suar or Sabir people